Tijuana Cartel are an electronic music group from Gold Coast, Australia. They have described their sound as electronic music with a world music element.

The group formed in 2003, taking their name from the movie Traffic. Originally consisting of Paul George and Carey O'Sullivan, they remain the sole consistent members of the group which has also included Joshua Sinclair, Daniel Gonzalez, She-J, and others within their live shows.

After releasing a self-titled EP in 2003, Tijuana Cartel released an EP titled Frequent Flyers which was expanded to become their 2007 debut album Frequent Flyers Redeemed. The album mixed flamenco guitar with electronic music, while later albums mixed dub, roots, and rock music sounds.

After receiving airplay on national radio station Triple J, the band began to gain some recognition and toured festivals around Australia. This led to further tours in Europe, India, and Beijing during the 2008 Olympic Games.

The Sydney Morning Herald called them "one of the most fearsome live bands in the country" but noted their albums often did not live up to that reputation until 2014's 24bit Guitar Orchestra.

Their 2015 album Psychedelicatessan was inspired by, and featured samples from, the Australian cult radio play What's Rangoon To You Is Grafton To Me, written and performed by Russell Guy and James Dibble. Russell visited Tijuana Cartel's studio while they were recording after they sought permission to use his work.

The band won Live Act Of The Year at 2018 and 2020's Gold Coast Music Awards. They are nominated for 2021's awards for Live Act Of The Year, and Video Of The Year for their song Minimal Stuffing.

Discography 
Frequent Flyers Redeemed - 2007

They Come - 2009

M1 - 2011

24bit Guitar Orchestra - 2014

Psychedelicatessan - 2015

Live at Hotel Brunswick - 2018

Acid Pony - 2021

External links

References 

Musical groups established in 2003